Rebecca Naa Dedei Aryeetey (1923 – 22 June 1961) also known as Dedei Ashikishan, was a Ghanaian business woman, political activist and a feminist. She was popularly known for her flour business in Accra. She is also the woman on Ghana's 50 Pesewas coin.

Early life 
Rebeca Naa Dedei  was born in 1923, at Osu and grew up in James Town, Accra. Her mother and father are from Ga Asere and Osu respectively.

Career 
After her primary education, Naa Dei went into the flour business. She became so wealthy and influential through her flour business which earned her the name ‘Ashikishan’, a Ga word meaning flour. She was known to be the chief financier of the then CPP party and led CPP women activities at her house in Kokomlemle - Accra. As a political activist of the CPP, she campaigned and funded Nkrumah and the CPP party and played a significant role during Ghana's struggle to attain independence. She financed Nkrumah to win the Ashiedu Keteke legislative council seat which made him to be the first Prime Minister of Ghana.

Death 
Her closeness to Nkrumah made her an enemy of rival political party which allegedly led to her early death.  She died tragically at a CPP function in Ho on 22 June 1961 at the age of 38. It was alleged that the political activists and feminist was poisoned at the function after taking a hot tea when she complained of stomach ache.

Honors 
The double-decker buses which were brought to Accra by Harry Sawyer were named after her 'Auntie Dedei', she also had her image on a national stamp and on Ghana's 50 pesewa coin, all in honour of her.

References

External links
 Bank of Ghana Annual Report 2007

1923 births
1961 deaths
20th-century Ghanaian businesswomen
20th-century Ghanaian businesspeople
People from Accra
20th-century Ghanaian women politicians